The blue-headed hummingbird (Riccordia bicolor) is a species of hummingbird in the "emeralds", tribe Trochilini of subfamily Trochilinae. It is found only on the islands of Dominica and Martinique in the Lesser Antilles.

Taxonomy and systematics

The blue-headed hummingbird was formally described in 1788 by the German naturalist Johann Friedrich Gmelin in his revised and expanded edition of Carl Linnaeus's Systema Naturae. He placed it with all the other hummingbirds in the genus Trochilus and coined the binomial name Trochilus bicolor. Gmelin based his description on "Le saphir-ésmeraude" that been described in 1779 by the French polymath Georges-Louis Leclerc, Comte de Buffon in his Histoire Naturelle des Oiseaux. Buffon believed his specimen had come from Guadeloupe but this was an error for Dominica.

The blue-headed hummingbird was formerly the only species placed in the genus Cyanophaia. A molecular phylogenetic study published in 2014 found that Cyanophaia was nested within the resurrected genus Riccordia. Based on that study and others, the North American Classification Committee of the American Ornithological Society, the International Ornithological Committee (IOC), and the Clements taxonomy merged it into Riccordia. However, as of 2020 BirdLife International's Handbook of the Birds of the World (HBW) retained it in Cyanophaia.

Genus Riccordia had originally been introduced in 1854 by the German ornithologist Ludwig Reichenbach with the Cuban emerald as the type species. Reichenbach based the genus name on the specific epithet of the type species recordii which had been chosen by Paul Gervais to honour the French surgeon-naturalist Alexandre Ricord (born 1798). The specific name bicolor is Latin meaning "two-colored".

The blue-headed hummingbird is monotypic.

Description

The male has a straight, mostly black, bill whose mandible is pinkish at the base. Its head is metallic violet-blue, the back shining green, and the uppertail coverts deep blue. The forked tail is steel blue. The chin and throat are the same metallic violet-blue as the head; the rest of the underparts are metallic green with a blue gloss. The female's bill is entirely black. Its crown is shining green and the cheeks dusky with a small gray spot behind the eye. Its back and flanks are bronze-green. The tail is shining bronze whose outer feathers have a wide steel blue band near the end and large gray tips. Its underside is pale brownish gray.

Distribution and habitat

The blue-headed hummingbird is restricted to the islands of Dominica and Martinique in the central Lesser Antilles. It inhabits the edges and interior of undisturbed forest and also secondary forest along rivers.

Behavior

Movement

The blue-headed hummingbird is sedentary.

Feeding

The blue-headed hummingbird forages for nectar from a variety of flowering plants and trees; it feeds at all levels of the forest. In addition to nectar it feeds on arthropods captured by hawking from a perch, especially over streams, and also gleans them from leaves.

Breeding

The blue-headed hummingbird's breeding season spans from March to May. It builds a cup nest of soft plant fibers like those of the silk-cotton (kapok) tree Ceiba pentandra and usually decorates its outside with dead leaves. The female incubates the clutch of two eggs for 16 to 18 days; fledging occurs 20 to 23 days after hatch.

Vocalization

The blue-headed hummingbird's calls include "shrill, metallic notes, rapidly descending in pitch, and a metallic 'click-click-click'."

Status

The IUCN has assessed the blue-headed hummingbird as being of Least Concern, though it has a limited range and its population size is unknown and believed to be decreasing. It is patchily distributed on the two small islands. The population on Dominica was greatly reduced by hurricanes in the 1980s and is only slowly recovering.

References

External links
Stamps (for Dominica, France)
Blue-headed hummingbird photo gallery VIREO
Photo-High Res Oiseaux

blue-headed hummingbird
Birds of the Lesser Antilles
Hummingbird species of Central America
blue-headed hummingbird
blue-headed hummingbird
Taxonomy articles created by Polbot
Endemic birds of the Caribbean
Taxobox binomials not recognized by IUCN